Jackson Hill is a summit in Rome, Georgia. The hill considered to be one of the Seven Hills of Rome, Georgia.

Jackson Hill was named for the local Jackson family, the original owners.

References

Mountains of Floyd County, Georgia
Mountains of Georgia (U.S. state)